Ahmet of Karaman, was a short term bey of  Karaman Beylik, a Turkish principality in Anatolia in the 14th century. He succeeded his father İbrahim Bey. But his succession date is not known. According to one source, he fell during a battle against Mongols in 1350.

References

Karamanids
1350 deaths
Year of birth unknown
14th-century monarchs in the Middle East
Ethnic Afshar people